Aparna Raina is a National Award Winning Production Designer. She started her Career in 2006 as an Art Assistant with the film Khosla Ka Ghosla and a Set Dresser in the critically Acclaimed film The Namesake. Since then she has worked on Several Films as Art Director and Production Designer. She was recently recognized for her work in the Hit Konkani Film Nachom - ia Kumpasar, for "convincingly recreating spaces from a different era and with minute attention to detail". She was awarded the 62nd National Film Awards for Best Production Design for Nachom - i.e. Kumpasar.

Filmography

Art Director
2012 Jodi Breakers
2010 Action Replayy
2008 Jaane Tu... Ya Jaane Na
2008 Thoda Pyaar Thoda Magic
2007 Just Married: Marriage Was Only the Beginning!
2005 Being Cyrus: Nominated for the Filmfare Award for Best Art Direction in 2007
Production Designer
 2014 Everest (TV Series ) (12 Episodes)
2014 Nachom-ia Kumpasar (Konkani)
2013 I, Me aur Main
2013 Dhoom Anthem (Yash Raj Films)
2011 My Friend Pinto
2008 Jaane Tu... Ya Jaane Na
2005 Being Cyrus
Art Department
2006 Khosla Ka Ghosla! (Assistant Art Director)
2006 The Namesake (Set Dresser: India)

Awards
2015 National Film Award for the Best Production Design (Film: Nachom-ia Kumpasar)

References

Living people
Indian art directors
Indian production designers
Year of birth missing (living people)
Place of birth missing (living people)
Best Production Design National Film Award winners
Women production designers
Indian women in film